Pierre M. Lapie (1777 or 1779 – 1850) was a French cartographer and engraver. He was the father of cartographer Alexandre Emile Lapie. Lapie was a Colonel in the French army, where he worked in the corps of topographical engineers. Lapie worked closely with his son and published works together and individually. The work of Lapie and his son was influential on German commercial map makers in the 19th century. Works by Lapie are held in the collection of the Library of Congress.

Works

1812, Atlas Classique et Universel
1842, Atlas universel de géographie ancienne et moderne with Alexandre Emile Lapie

Gallery

References

19th-century engravers
19th-century French military personnel
French cartographers
French engravers
1770s births
1850 deaths